Stadion Metalurh is a multi-purpose stadium in Kryvyi Rih, Ukraine. It is located near the city's neighborhood "Sotsmisto" (Social city).

It is currently used mostly for football matches, and was the home of FC Kryvbas Kryvyi Rih. The stadium holds 29,734 people. The station Prospekt Metalurhiv of the Kryvyi Rih Metro is located next to the stadium.

The stadium was built in 1970. For the 225th city anniversary in 1999, the stadium was renovated and had individual seats installed. During the Soviet period until 1988, the stadium was used by FC Dnipro to play in European competitions as the city of Dnipro (Dnipropetrovsk then) was a closed city.

On 14 May 2006, Metalurh Stadium hosted the gold match between Shakhtar and Dynamo. The winning goal in extra time during the game was scored by Julius Aghahowa.

Since 2012, the stadium had required renovations and in 2012 had some money allocated for it from the city budget.

On 28 February 2018, the city council adopted decision on stadium reconstruction.

On 27 August 2020 it was announced that reconstruction cost for the stadium may be increased to ₴600 million in order to prepare the stadium to the 2022 Ukrainian Cup Final. It is expected the stadium's capacity will decrease to 16,750. About a week before the President of Ukraine instructed to prepare Kryvyi Rih to host the Cup final.

On 5 February 2021, the stadium was completely demolished for reconstruction.

Gallery

External links
 www.stadiumguide.com information

References

Sport in Kryvyi Rih
Football venues in Dnipropetrovsk Oblast
Multi-purpose stadiums in Ukraine
Buildings and structures in Kryvyi Rih
Sports venues in Dnipropetrovsk Oblast